The Canadian Masters was a professional snooker tournament.

History
The tournament was first held in 1974 and was named Canadian Open in Toronto, Ontario, Canada. It was part of Canadian National Exhibition Week. It was however discontinued after it clashed with the early start of the Main Tour. The event was revived in 1985, and was retitled as Canadian Masters. It was an eight-man invitation event held at the CBC Television Studios. The tournament was sponsored by BCE in 1985 and 1986.

In 1987 the tournament became part of the World Series and Labatt's overtook sponsorship of the event. In 1989 it became the first ranking event held overseas, although only the stages from the last 32 were held in Canada. BCE sponsored the tournament, which was won by Jimmy White, who defeated Steve Davis 9–4 to win £40,000.

It was held in the Minkler Auditorium, with the crowd filling the 1000 seats (Seneca Village, 1750 Finch Ave E, Toronto M2H)

Winners

References

 
Snooker ranking tournaments
Recurring sporting events established in 1974
Recurring events disestablished in 1989
1974 establishments in Ontario
1989 disestablishments in Ontario
Snooker non-ranking competitions
Defunct snooker competitions